Governor Hart may refer to:

John Hart (Governor of Maryland) (fl. 1710s–1720s), 12th Royal Governor of Maryland from 1714 to 1715
Louis F. Hart (1862–1929), 9th Governor of Washington
Ossian B. Hart (1821–1874), 10th Governor of Florida